The Pirate Party of Chile is a political party yet to be approved by the national Electoral Service (SERVEL). The party was created in 2007 based on the model of the Swedish Pirate Party, founded in 2006 by Rick Falkvinge. The name refers to the concept of digital pirate, trying to take the negative name that the Internet practice of illegal downloading and sharing is called, and transform it into a constructive movement for culture.

Pirate Party of Chile is also member of the Dignidad Ahora Coalition

References

External Links
Official Website
Twitter

2007 establishments in Chile
Chile
Political parties established in 2007
Political parties in Chile